Vernon Township is a township in Palo Alto County, Iowa, USA.

References

Palo Alto County, Iowa
Townships in Iowa